The Nigerien Confederation of Labour (CNT) is a trade union federation in Niger. Founded in 1996, the CNT unites 5 unions, and is affiliated with the International Trade Union Confederation.

See also

Trade unions in Niger

References

Trade unions in Niger
International Trade Union Confederation
Trade unions established in 1996
1996 establishments in Niger